Ryan Hughes (born  January 17, 1972) is a Canadian former professional ice hockey player. Hughes played three games in the National Hockey League (NHL) for the Boston Bruins during the 1995–96 season. His older brother, Kent, is the general manager of the Montreal Canadiens of the NHL.

Career
Hughes played junior ice hockey with the Lac St-Louis Lions Midget AAA team from 1987 to 1989. In 1988–89, he played three games for the Canadian national team. Hughes then played ice hockey with Cornell University Big Red from 1989 until 1993. After his first season with Cornell, when he scored seven goals and 16 assists for 23 points in 28 games, he was selected in the second round, 22nd overall by the Quebec Nordiques in the 1990 NHL Entry Draft. In 1992, Hughes played for Canada in the World Junior Championship, scoring one assist in seven games. 

After completing college, Hughes made his professional debut with the Cornwall Aces of the American Hockey League (AHL) in the 1993–94 season. After two seasons with Cornwall, Hughes signed as a free agent with the Boston Bruins. He played most of the season with their AHL team, the Providence Bruins, and earned a call-up to Boston. He played three games with Boston, without recording a point. Hughes played one further season in professional ice hockey, with the Quebec Rafales and Chicago Wolves of the International Hockey League.

Career statistics

Regular season and playoffs

International

Awards and honors

References 
 

1972 births
Living people
Boston Bruins players
Canadian ice hockey centres
Chicago Wolves (IHL) players
Cornell Big Red men's ice hockey players
Cornwall Aces players
Providence Bruins players
Quebec Nordiques draft picks
Quebec Rafales players